Michael Anthony “Mike” Hunt (born October 6, 1956) is a former professional American football player who played linebacker for three seasons for the Green Bay Packers, appearing in a total of 22 games.

The Packers selected Hunt from the University of Minnesota in the second round of the 1978 NFL Draft. Hunt played all 16 games in his rookie season, but began to suffer from the effects of head and neck injuries. He appeared in only three games in 1979, when he was forced to the injured reserve list because of knee surgery, and three more in 1980. On September 21, 1980, Hunt was kneed in the head during a game against the Los Angeles Rams and suffered a concussion. As a result of these injuries, this was to be his final NFL game. After spending 1981 on the reserve-retired list, Hunt attempted a comeback in the 1982 preseason, but was forced to retire on August 3, 1982 because of recurring concussions. His name has also been synonymous with a raunchy pun.

References

1956 births
Living people
People from Madison, Minnesota
Players of American football from Minnesota
American football linebackers
Minnesota Golden Gophers football players
Green Bay Packers players